Liolaemus pachecoi is a species of lizard in the family Iguanidae.  It is from Bolivia and Chile.

References

pachecoi
Lizards of South America
Reptiles of Bolivia
Reptiles of Chile
Reptiles described in 1995
Taxa named by Raymond Laurent